Omar Khayyam Square is a city square named after Omar Khayyam in Nishapur, Iran. This square is one of the most important squares of the city of Nishapur. The previous monument of the Mausoleum of Omar Khayyam was moved and placed on the center of this square in the 20th century.

Buildings and structures in Nishapur
Omar Khayyam
Buildings and structures in Razavi Khorasan Province
Squares in Iran